"Like a G6" is a song by American music group Far East Movement featuring fellow American musicians Dev and The Cataracs, released as the lead single from Far East Movement's third studio album Free Wired. The track reached number one on the US Billboard Hot 100 for three non-consecutive weeks, becoming the first single by Asian-American artists to do so and the first by any artists of East Asian origin since Kyu Sakamoto's 1963 single "Sukiyaki". Outside of the United States, "Like a G6" topped the chart in New Zealand and peaked within the top 10 of the charts in Australia, Canada, Belgium, the Netherlands, Sweden, Switzerland, Slovakia, and the United Kingdom.

Background

Dev's vocals in "Like a G6" are sampled from her previous song "Booty Bounce", another song written and produced by the Cataracs. The "G6" in the song came about when the Cataracs were looking for a rhyme for the line "Sippin' sizzurp in my ride, like Three 6", a reference to the 2000 song "Sippin' on Some Syrup" by rap group Three 6 Mafia. They settled on "G6", meant to be a reference to the private airplane model Gulfstream IV, referred to as a "G4". The G4 had been name-checked in songs such as Drake's 2009 "Forever". A G6, they decided, was "flyer than a G4", according to Far East Movement member Kev Nish. The song has been incorrectly speculated to be about other things, including the Pontiac G6 and the Suunto G6 watch. When the song came out, the Gulfstream G650 model already existed, although the song's writers were not aware of this at the time. Since then, the Gulfstream G600 has also been announced.

Reception
The song has sold 4 million paid downloads in the US, according to Nielsen SoundScan.

Gulfstream Aerospace has stated that they were "thrilled" about the product reference.

Music video
The music video, which was directed by Matt Alonzo premiered on YouTube and Vevo on June 2, 2010. The line "sippin' sizzurp" and the word "slizzered" are censored on some channels. It follows a woman in a red dress (Erica Ocampo) picking up a friend from a restaurant and going to a liquor store, presumably in preparation for a party. A later scene shows the woman and her friends at the party, Colette Carr also make a cameo, Dev, The Cataracs and the members of Far East Movement can also be seen in this party scene. The final scene shows the members of Far East Movement getting on a Gulfstream IV the next morning. The music video was produced by Skee.TV (Producers: Satien Mehta, Mike Busalacchi)

Charts

Weekly charts

Year-end charts

Certifications

Release history

Covers and parodies
 Diddy – Dirty Money covered "Like a G6" as part of their set for BBC Radio 1's Live Lounge in the United Kingdom, alongside "Coming Home". The song then appeared on the sixth compilation of the Live Lounge.   
 Colette Carr did a cover of the song, with new lyrics on her debut mixtape Sex Sells Stay Tooned along with Cherry Cherry Boom Boom.
 Richard Cheese covered "Like a G6" on his 2011 album A Lounge Supreme.
 Connor Anderson made a parody of the song called "Roll a D6".
 "Like Jesus" was a parody produced by Totally Sketch.
 American comedian, musician and Internet personality Nice Peter recorded a Harry Potter-themed parody of the song called "Like It's Quidditch".
 British comedian Adam Buxton parodied the song in several different incarnations on the Adam and Joe radio show on BBC 6 Music in the United Kingdom.
 Russian rapper  released a remix of the song in December 2022.

See also 
 List of songs recorded by Dev
 List of Billboard Hot 100 number ones of 2010
 List of UK R&B Singles Chart number ones of 2010
 List of number-one singles from the 2010s (New Zealand)

References 

2010 singles
Far East Movement songs
Dev (singer) songs
The Cataracs songs
Billboard Hot 100 number-one singles
Number-one singles in New Zealand
Song recordings produced by the Cataracs
Cherrytree Records singles
Interscope Records singles
2009 songs
Songs about alcohol
Songs written by David Singer-Vine
Songs written by Kshmr
Songs written by Dev (singer)